Anthony Joseph "Tony" Ayers  (16 September 193311 April 2016) was an Australian public servant.

Life and career
Ayers was born on 16 September 1933. His first job was teaching in a Victorian school. He later was an education officer in Pentridge Prison, Melbourne.

In 1967 Ayers moved to Canberra as Director of Welfare in the Department of the Interior.

He was appointed to his first Secretary role in 1979 as head of the Department of Aboriginal Affairs. Ayers moved soon after, in 1981, to the Department of Social Security (DSS). During his time at DSS he served concurrently for three months as Acting Secretary of the Department of Community Services. Ayers moved to an appointment as Secretary of the Department of Community Services and Health when the Hawke Government restructured the public service and created "super ministries" in 1987.

Ayers' final posting in the Australian Public Service was as Secretary of the Department of Defence between 1988 and 1998. Ayers was praised for his work in the Department, one of the few departmental heads who has left the Department of Defence of their own accord, rather than being compelled to leave by the Defence Minister, in the last 30 years.

Ayers died on 11 April 2016.

Awards
Ayers was made an Officer of the Order of Australia in June 1985. In January 1993 he was promoted to a Companion of the Order of Australia, in recognition of service to leadership in the development and implementation of administrative structures, systems and procedures.

References

1933 births
2016 deaths
Australian public servants
Companions of the Order of Australia
Secretaries of the Australian Department of Defence
Secretaries of the Australian Government Health Department